Port Glasgow Curling Club is a curling club originating in Port Glasgow, Inverclyde, Scotland.  Part of the Renfrewshire (12th) province of Area 5, the club plays at the Waterfront Leisure Complex curling rink in Greenock.

History

Port Glasgow Curling Club was formed in 1827 and admitted to the Royal Caledonian Curling Club in 1840.

Competitions

Members of the club's 12 rinks play annually for a number of club trophies, as well as against other local clubs in external competitions.

See also

List of curling clubs in Scotland

External links
 Port Glasgow Curling Club

Curling clubs in Scotland
Port Glasgow
Sport in Inverclyde